Winnipeg South is a Canadian federal electoral district in Manitoba, Canada, that has been represented in the House of Commons of Canada from 1917 to 1979, and since 1988. It covers the southernmost part of the city of Winnipeg.

History
The electoral district was created in 1914 from parts of Winnipeg, Provencher and Macdonald riding and first contested at the 1917 election.

In 1976, it was abolished when it was redistributed into the ridings of Winnipeg—Assiniboine, and Winnipeg—Fort Garry.

In 1987, it was re-created from parts of Winnipeg—Assiniboine and Winnipeg—Fort Garry and has been contested since the 1988 election.

Some observers expected Winnipeg South to be a close race in 2011, though these predictions were later proven wrong. This race was close in 2006, when Conservative challenger Rod Bruinooge defeated four-term Liberal incumbent Reg Alcock by just 111 votes. In 2008, Bruinooge improved his plurality to nearly 6,000 votes. His Liberal challenger was businessperson, party activist, and former Winnipeg City Council member Terry Duguid.

This riding lost territory to Winnipeg South Centre and Saint Boniface—Saint Vital, and gained territory from the latter during the 2012 electoral redistribution. Bruinooge chose not to contest the 2015 election, and Duguid won the seat for the Liberal Party.

Members of Parliament

This riding has elected the following members of the House of Commons:

Current Member of Parliament
Terry Duguid has represented Winnipeg South since the 2015 election. He was re-elected in 2019 and 2021.

Election results

1988–present

1917–1979

Note: NDP vote is compared to CCF vote in 1958 election.

Note: Progressive Conservative vote is compared to "National Government" vote in 1940 election.

Note: "National Government" vote is compared to Conservative vote in 1935 election. 

Note: Conservative vote is compared to Government vote in 1917 election. Liberal vote is compared to Opposition vote in 1917 election.

See also
 List of Canadian federal electoral districts
 Past Canadian electoral districts

References

Notes

External links
 
 
 Expenditures - 2008
Expenditures - 2004

Manitoba federal electoral districts
Politics of Winnipeg
Waverley West, Winnipeg
Fort Garry, Winnipeg
St. Vital, Winnipeg